The Monastery of Santa María (Spanish: Monasterio Cisterciense de Santa María) is a Cistercian nunnery located in Cañas, Spain. 

Nuns first occupied the site in the 12th century.
The complex has been protected by a heritage listing since 1943 (currently Bien de Interés Cultural).

References 

Bien de Interés Cultural landmarks in La Rioja (Spain)
Cistercian nunneries in Spain